The first season of the television series Ally McBeal began airing in the United States on September 8, 1997, concluded on May 18, 1998, and consisted of 23 episodes. It tells the story of Ally McBeal, a young lawyer who found herself without a job after being sexually harassed by her boss, only to end up employed by her friend from college, Richard Fish, to work in the firm he created with his friend John Cage, named "Cage & Fish".

The entire season aired Mondays at 9 pm. It was released on DVD as a six disc boxed set under the title of Ally McBeal: Season One on October 7, 2002. Due to music rights issues, several episodes of the first season of Ally McBeal were only available in the United States. The first season had an average rating of 11.4 million viewers in the United States and was ranked #59 on the complete ranking sheet of all the year's shows. A month after the conclusion of the first season, a debate sparked by the show was the cover story of Time magazine, which juxtaposed McBeal with three pioneering feminists and asked "Is Feminism Dead?".

On the 50th Primetime Emmy Awards, the show won its first Emmy in the category of Outstanding Sound Mixing for a Comedy Series or a Special for the episode "Boy to the World", and was nominated in nine other categories. On the 55th Golden Globe Awards, the show won in two categories, one for the Best Series, and one for the Best Actress, for Calista Flockhart's portrayal of Ally.

Crew
The season was produced by 20th Century Fox Home Entertainment and David E. Kelley Productions. The sole executive producer was the creator David E. Kelley, who also wrote all 23 episodes, with the exception of co-writing with Nicole Yorkin and Dawn Prestwich on the episode "Body Language" and with Jeff Pinkner on the episode "Once in a Lifetime". Jonathan Pontell served as the supervising producer, while Jeffrey Kramer served as the co-executive producer.

Cast
The first season had seven major roles receive star billing. Calista Flockhart portrayed protagonist Ally McBeal, a lawyer employed by her friend Richard Fish, who was played by Greg Germann. Fish opened a firm with John Cage, played by Peter MacNicol, who was billed as a guest star during the first eleven episodes and promoted to series regular status in episode number 12. Jane Krakowski played Ally's secretary Elaine Vassal, while the role of Ally's friend Renée Raddick was played by Lisa Nicole Carson. Ally's love from childhood, Billy Thomas, was played  by Gil Bellows, while Courtney Thorne-Smith played his wife Georgia, who works with her husband at the same law firm.

Various supporting characters included Dyan Cannon as Whipper Cone, a judge who had a relationship with Richard Fish for a while; Albert Hall as Seymore Walsh, a stern judge with little sense of humor and a general dislike of the Cage and Fish law firm; Jennifer Holliday as Lisa Knowles, the lead choir singer at the local church who had a history with the reverend; Phil Leeds as Happy Boyle, a very old judge who was obsessed with dental hygiene; Jesse L. Martin as Ally's date, Dr. Greg Butters; Harrison Page as the reverend at the local church, who had a history with lead choir singer Lisa Knowles; Tracey Ullman as Ally's unconventional therapist; and Vonda Shepard as a musical performer at the bar where the lawyers used to hang out every night after finishing their daily jobs. Shepard performed in every episode of the entire season, and was upped to series regular status in the upcoming season. Renée Elise Goldsberry, Vatrena King and Sy Smith appeared at the bar as the Ikettes, the backup singers for Vonda and other performers. The first season also included a crossover episode from another David E. Kelley show, The Practice. The second part of the crossover was the episode titled "Axe Murderer" which began on the Ally McBeal episode titled "The Inmates", which aired April 27, 1998, and has several characters from The Practice. Calista Flockhart and Gil Bellows, in return, guest starred on The Practice episode "Axe Murderer".

Episodes

References

External links
 Ally McBeal Episode List at IMDb

1997 American television seasons
1998 American television seasons
Ally McBeal